Dance of the Sky Empire (Chinese: 天舞纪; pinyin: Tiān Wû Jì) is a 2020 Chinese television series that set in Tang Dynasty. The series is adapted from Fantasy novel of the same name by writer Bu Feiyan and stars Xu Kai, Wu Jiayi, Hankiz Omar, Zhou Junchao, Li Junchen, and Yu Xintong.

It premieres on iQIYI globally with multi languages subtitles on 8 July 2020.

Synopsis 
The story is set against the backdrop of the prosperous Tang Dynasty in an era where humans and demons coexisted. The arrival of Li Xuan, a human and demon hybrid, breaks the fragile peace. During this time, Li Xuan and Su You Lian develop a complicated relationships. As Li Xuan eventually becomes a hero to the people, he faces a dilemma of having to decide where his allegiance lies.

Dance of the Sky Empire - nearWiki

Cast

Main 

 Xu Kai as Li Xuan
 Wu Jiayi as Su You Lian
 Hankiz Omar as Yun Shan
 Zhou Junchao as Xiao Feng Ming
 Li Junchen as Yu Feng Mu
 Yu Xintong as Long Wei Er

References

External links 

 Dance of the Empire--Official Weibo
 Dance of the Empire on iQIYI
 

Chinese television series